Ernst Ocwirk (7 March 1926 – 23 January 1980) was an Austrian football player and coach. He is regarded as one of the greatest Austrian footballers of all time.

He spent the majority of his playing and coaching years between Austria and Italy, being both player and manager for FK Austria Vienna and Serie A club Sampdoria. He also went on to become a member of the Austria national team, which he led to a third-place finish at the 1954 World Cup as its captain.

Nicknamed Clockwork by the British for his midfield consistency, as well as the nickname being suggested by his surname, he is often cited as the last of the old-fashioned attacking centre-halves; he was known for his aesthetic and technical style of playing, his heading ability, excellent timing (both in offensive and defensive tasks) and his passing range; particularly his long passing ability. The fans loved him for his modest and fair personality. The international media of the era saw Ocwirk as "the best centerhalf in the world". He is considered one of the greatest central midfielders of all time.

Club career
Born in Vienna, Ocwirk began his career as a striker. He joined his first club, the local FC Stadlau, in 1938. He then played for Floridsdorfer AC, where he was spotted by former Austrian international Josef Smistik, who moved Ocwirk to centre midfield. Smistik tried to bring him to his former team, Rapid Wien, but it was rivals FK Austria who won the race for his services and, in 1947, signed him.

In a decade at Austria Vienna, Ocwirk became one of the most prominent players for the club, helping them to win five Austrian League championships and three domestic cups.

Brought to Sampdoria by Alberto Ravano, he was the second Austrian footballer ever to play in Serie A after Engelbert König had done it in the 1940s. He also remained the last Austrian in Serie A until 1980, when Herbert Prohaska played for Inter Milan. Ocwirk would play five seasons at the Genova club, of which he became the captain. In 1961, he returned to FK Austria to play the final season of his career, winning the "double" in 1961–62.

Ocwirk was chosen in Austria's Team of the Century in 2001.

International career
Ocwirk won 62 caps and scored six goals for his country.  He made his debut for his country in 1945 before appearing at the 1948 Olympic Games in London.

By 1953 the stopper centre-back had taken over, so Ocwirk was selected as a wing-half for a Rest-of-the-World team which drew 4–4 with England to celebrate the 90th birthday of the Football Association. His international successes earned him the honour of twice being named captain of the "FIFA World team".

At the 1954 World Cup, Ocwirk captained Austria and played in all five of his team matches, helping it achieve its best ever World Cup finish, third place. The centre-half scored two goals during the tournament: the one that gave Austria the lead after trailing 3–0 in the memorable quarter-final against hosts Switzerland, and the 3–1 in the third-place match against reigning champions Uruguay.

Coaching career
Immediately after retiring from playing, Ocwirk became a manager, and Sampdoria was the first team he coached, from 1962 to 1965. He also managed German side 1. FC Köln one year, taking them to the final of the DFB Cup.

Death and legacy

In January 1980, at the age of 53, he died of multiple sclerosis, in Klein-Pöchlarn, Lower Austria. His death occurred on the same date that Matthias Sindelar died 41 years before.

A friendly tournament was played in July 1981 in homage to Ernst Ocwirk at Wiener Stadion.  The participants were FK Austria Wien, SK Rapid Wien, Ferencvárosi TC and Bayern Munich. Bayern Munich won the tournament.

Honours
Austria Wien
 Austrian Football Bundesliga: 1949, 1950, 1953, 1962, 1963
 Austrian Cup: 1948, 1949, 1962

Austria
 FIFA World Cup third place: 1954

Individual
 FIFA World Cup All-Star Team: 1954

References

External links

 FIFA
 Profile – FK Austria
 Player profile – Austria Archive
 UEFA
 

1926 births
1980 deaths
Footballers from Vienna
Association football midfielders
Austrian footballers
Austria international footballers
Austrian expatriate footballers
Olympic footballers of Austria
Footballers at the 1948 Summer Olympics
1954 FIFA World Cup players
U.C. Sampdoria managers
FK Austria Wien players
U.C. Sampdoria players
Austrian Football Bundesliga players
Serie A players
Expatriate footballers in Italy
Austrian football managers
FK Austria Wien managers
1. FC Köln managers
FC Admira Wacker Mödling managers
Expatriate football managers in Italy
Expatriate football managers in Germany
Austrian expatriate football managers
Burials at the Vienna Central Cemetery
Neurological disease deaths in Austria
Deaths from multiple sclerosis